The Speaker of the Rajasthan Legislative Assembly is the presiding officer of the Legislative Assembly of the state of Rajasthan, the main law-making body for the Indian state of Rajasthan. He is elected by the members of the Rajasthan Legislative Assembly. The speaker is always a member of the Legislative Assembly.

List of Speaker of Rajasthan

References

 Former Speakers of Rajasthan Legislative Assembly
 RAJASTHAN LEGISLATIVE ASSEMBLY

Speakers
 
Lists of legislative speakers in India